North Carolina Highway 51 (NC 51) is a primary state highway in the U.S. state of North Carolina entirely in Mecklenburg County. It connects the towns of Pineville, Matthews and Mint Hill.

Route description

Though NC 51 begins at the state line, SC 51 is a short  road that connects with US 21, near Fort Mill, South Carolina. Crossing the state line, NC 51 quickly becomes a four-lane road as it goes through the town of Pineville. After its first intersection with I-485, it enters the Charlotte city limits. In Charlotte, NC 51 crosses the busy intersections of Johnston Road and Providence Road, known for rush-hour traffic during the weekdays. In Matthews, NC 51 bypasses the main downtown area, followed by a semi-controlled interchanged with US 74 (Independence Boulevard). As the NC 51 enters Mint Hill, the road narrows to two-lane. NC 51 crosses intersects I-485 again, before ending at NC 24/NC 27 (Albemarle Road).

History
The first NC 51 was an original state highway that traveled from NC 20, in Rockingham, to NC 74, in Wadeville. In 1928, Rockingham to Ellerbe became an extension of NC 75. In 1934, NC 51 was decommissioned in favor of NC 73, between Ellerbe and Mount Gilead, and NC 109, between Mount Gilead and Wadeville.

The second and current NC 51 was established in 1934 as a renumbering of NC 276, between US 21/US 521, in Pineville, to NC 27, near Allen. In 1968, NC 51 was extended to the South Carolina state line, replacing a segment of US 21. In 1981, NC 51 was placed on new alignment in Pineville, abandoning an old routing along Lee Street and eliminating a short concurrency with US 521. In 1995, NC 51 was placed on new bypass north of downtown Matthews, marked as Matthews Township Parkway. The old alignment along Matthews-Mint Hill Road was downgraded to secondary road.

North Carolina Highway 276

North Carolina Highway 276 (NC 276) appeared in 1930 as new primary routing from NC 26, in Pineville, to NC 27, near Allen. In 1934, it was renumbered as the second NC 51.

Major intersections

References

External links

NCRoads.com: N.C. 51
NCRoads.com: N.C. 276

051
Transportation in Charlotte, North Carolina
Transportation in Mecklenburg County, North Carolina